Bettinson is a surname. Notable people with the surname include:

Les Bettinson, rugby league player, coach, and administrator
Laura Bettinson, stage name FEMME, British singer, songwriter, and producer
John Bettinson (born 1940), British cyclist
Arthur Frederick Bettinson, boxer